Su-ngai Kolok is a district (amphoe) of Narathiwat province, southern Thailand.

History
The minor district (king amphoe) was created on 2 January 1948, consisting of the three tambons: Su-ngai Kolok, Puyo, and Pase Mat from Su-ngai Padi district and Muno from Tak Bai district. In 1953 it was upgraded to a full district.

Geography
Neighboring districts are (from the southwest clockwise) Waeng, Su-ngai Padi and Tak Bai. To the southeast is the state Kelantan of Malaysia.

The main water resource is the Kolok River.

Administration
The district is divided into four sub-districts (tambons), which are further subdivided into 19 villages (mubans). Su-ngai Kolok itself has town (thesaban mueang) status and covers most parts of the same-named tambon.

References

External links
amphoe.com

Districts of Narathiwat province
Malaysia–Thailand border crossings